Iwaoka (written: 岩岡) is a Japanese surname. Notable people with the surname include:

, Japanese manga artist
, Japanese ice hockey player

Japanese-language surnames